Joseph Cassidy (born 30 July 1872) was a Scottish footballer who played as a forward. Born in Dalziel, Lanarkshire, Cassidy started his career with Motherwell Athletic before joining Blythe in 1890. In 1893, he was transferred to Newton Heath, where he played in the last four league games of the season, as well as a test match against Small Heath, in which he scored to keep Newton Heath in the First Division. After two months with the Heathens, he moved to Celtic. In 1895, he returned to Newton Heath, who had by now dropped into the Second Division. In seven seasons back with the club, Cassidy played 163 games and scored 99 goals. He went on to play for Manchester City and Middlesbrough. At the latter club, he would be captain for their first game at Ayresome Park, also scoring the first competitive goal at the new ground. He moved to Workington in 1906.

References
General

Specific

1872 births
Year of death missing
Scottish footballers
Association football forwards
Manchester United F.C. players
Celtic F.C. players
Manchester City F.C. players
Middlesbrough F.C. players
Workington A.F.C. players
Scottish Football League players
English Football League players
Footballers from Motherwell